Gelephu Airport  is located in Samtenling Gewog, about  from the town of Gelephu in Sarpang District, Bhutan. It is one of only four airports in Bhutan.

History
The airport was inaugurated in October 2012, but regular scheduled operations were delayed for five years due to its lack of certification from the Department of Civil Aviation of Bhutan and because of funding issues. The airport was originally planned as an international airport but the plan was shelved in 2008. In January 2015, The Department of Civil Aviation told Kuensel that the airport had been closed to scheduled flights due to the need to construct a new terminal building and control tower. A spokesperson said that it was hoped the new structures would be completed in February 2015, and at that point "from our side it’ll be [ready to] open to scheduled flights." Despite this, it was reported that Drukair was not aware of the airport's reopening and stated that it would not launch commercial flights until it had studied the market conditions to ensure scheduled operations were viable. After a brief period of flights in 2015, which were found to be uneconomic, flights eventually re-commenced in November 2017 with financial support from the Royal Bhutanese Government.

Airlines and destinations

See also

 Transport in Bhutan
 List of airports in Bhutan

References

Airports in Bhutan